Lacto-ovo vegetarianism or ovo-lacto vegetarianism is a type of vegetarianism which forbids animal flesh but allows the consumption of animal products such as dairy and eggs. Unlike pescetarianism, it does not include fish or other seafood. A typical ovo-lacto vegetarian diet may include fruits, vegetables, grains, legumes, meat substitutes, nuts, seeds, soy, cheese, milk, yogurt and eggs. 

In India, such vegetarians are known as "eggetarian," which is a portmanteau of egg and vegetarian as "vegetarianism" usually refers to lacto vegetarianism in India.

Etymology 
The terminology stems from the Latin lac meaning "milk" (as in 'lactation'), ovum meaning "egg", and the English term vegetarian, so as giving the definition of a vegetarian diet containing milk and eggs.

Diet 

In the Western world, ovo-lacto vegetarians are the most common and most traditional type of vegetarian. Generally speaking, when one uses the term vegetarian, an ovo-lacto vegetarian is assumed. Ovo-lacto vegetarians are often well-catered for in restaurants and shops, especially in some parts of Europe and metropolitan cities in North America.

Religion 

In Indian religions like Hinduism and Buddhism, most individuals are either raised as ovo-lacto vegetarians or lacto vegetarians.

However, consumption of egg is not considered a part of vegetarian diet in India, as egg is an animal-product that gives birth to the next generation of that species. Those who consume egg, while not consuming other non-vegetarian products (such as fish and meat), refer to themselves as 'eggitarians'.

The Bible Christian Church was a Christian vegetarian sect founded by William Cowherd in 1809. Cowherd was one of the philosophical forerunners of the Vegetarian Society founded in 1847. The Bible Christian Church promoted the use of eggs, dairy and honey as God's given food per "the promised land flowing with milk and honey" (Exodus 3:8).

Many Seventh-day Adventist followers are ovo-lacto vegetarians and have recommended a vegetarian diet, which may include milk products and eggs, since late 19th century.

Health effects

Lacto-ovo vegetarian diets have a high overall diet quality compared to non-vegetarian diets. Lacto-ovo vegetarian diets have positive effects on blood lipids such as lowering low-density lipoprotein and total cholesterol and are associated with a reduced risk of cancer and cardiovascular disease.

There is high-quality evidence that lacto-ovo vegetarian diets reduce blood pressure.

See also 

 Lacto vegetarianism
 List of butter dishes
 List of cheese dishes
 List of dairy products
 List of diets
 List of egg dishes
 List of vegetable dishes
 List of vegetarian restaurants
 Ovo vegetarianism
 Pescetarianism
 Sentient foods
 Plant-based diet

References 

Vegetarian diets

pt:Vegetarianismo#Ovolactovegetarianismo